Douglas County is a county located in  the south-central portion of the U.S. state of Missouri. As of the 2020 census, the population was 11,578. The county seat and only incorporated community is Ava. The county was officially organized on October 19, 1857, and is named after U.S. Senator Stephen A. Douglas (D-Illinois) and later Democratic presidential candidate.

History

Previously, the county seat was located at Arno, west of Ava. Prior to that, Vera Cruz (formerly called Red Bud) was the county seat. Vera Cruz is located on Bryant Creek, which flows through the middle of the county. The Civil War Battle of Clark's Mill took place near Vera Cruz on November 7, 1862, and resulted in a Confederate victory. After the American Civil War, during a period of general chaos, a group from the western part of the county broke into the Arno courthouse and removed the records back to Vera Cruz. Later in 1871, a new town site was selected, present-day Ava, near the location of the former U.S. Civil War military Post Office, Militia Spring. The location of this new town seemed to satisfy most of the residents of Douglas County to be their point of county government.

Geography

Adjacent counties
Webster County (northwest)
Wright County (north)
Texas County (northeast)
Howell County (east)
Ozark County (south)
Taney County (southwest)
Christian County (west)

Major highways

 Route 5
 Route 14
 Route 76
 Route 95
 Route 181

National protected area
Mark Twain National Forest (part)

Demographics

As of the census of 2000, there were 13,084 people, 5,201 households, and 3,671 families residing in the county. The population density was 16 people per square mile (6/km2).  There were 5,919 housing units at an average density of 7 per square mile (3/km2). The racial makeup of the county was 96.86% White, 0.11% Black or African American, 0.95% Native American, 0.21% Asian, 0.02% Pacific Islander, 0.17% from other races, and 1.69% from two or more races. Approximately 0.84% of the population were Hispanic or Latino of any race. Among the major first ancestries reported in Douglas County are 31.3% American, 13.2% English, 12.3% German, and 9.7% Irish.

There were 5,201 households, out of which 30.10% had children under the age of 18 living with them, 60.00% were married couples living together, 7.20% had a female householder with no husband present, and 29.40% were non-families. 26.10% of all households were made up of individuals, and 13.00% had someone living alone who was 65 years of age or older. The average household size was 2.49 and the average family size was 2.99.

In the county, the population was spread out, with 25.80% under the age of 18, 7.00% from 18 to 24, 24.50% from 25 to 44, 25.60% from 45 to 64, and 17.10% who were 65 years of age or older. The median age was 40 years. For every 100 females there were 96.60 males. For every 100 females age 18 and over, there were 93.30 males.

The median income for a household in the county was $31,335, and the median income for a family was $36,648. Males had a median income of $22,706 versus $17,060 for females. The per capita income for the county was $16,710. About 12.90% of families and 17.50% of the population were below the poverty line, including 19.80% of those under age 18 and 18.20% of those age 65 or over.

Religion
According to the Association of Religion Data Archives County Membership Report (2000), Douglas County is a part of the Bible Belt with evangelical Protestantism being the majority religion. The most predominant denominations among residents in Douglas County who adhere to a religion are Southern Baptists (22.95%), Church of the Nazarene (16.28%), and Mormons (13.70%).

Established in 1950, a Trappist monastery, Assumption Abbey, can be found nestled on 3,000 acres in the Ozark hills. An associated Friary, Our Lady of the Angels, is located nearby. Both facilities have overnight rooms available to be utilized by the public for a small fee in order to find a place of solace and quiet reflection.

2020 Census

Education
Of adults 25 years of age and older in Douglas County, 69.7% possess a high school diploma or higher while 9.9% hold a bachelor's degree or higher as their highest educational attainment.

Public schools

Ava R-I School District - Ava
Ava Elementary School (PK-04)
Ava Middle School (05-08)
Ava High School (09-12)
 Plainview R8 School District - Goodhope, Missouri
Plainview Elementary School (K-08) - West of Ava
 Skyline R2 School District - Norwood, Missouri
Skyline Elementary (K-08)

Private schools
Mt. Zion Bible Academy - Ava - (PK-12) - Church of God

Public libraries
Douglas County Public Library

Politics

Local

The Republican party holds most of the elected positions in the county, though this has not always been the case; in the early 1900s, Douglas County was primarily Democratic.

State

All of Douglas County is a part of Missouri's 155th District

All of Douglas County is a part of Missouri's 33rd District.

Federal
Missouri's two U.S. Senators are Republican Josh Hawley and Republican Roy Blunt of Strafford.

All of Douglas County is included in Missouri's 8th Congressional District and is currently represented by Jason T. Smith of Salem in the U.S. House of Representatives. Smith won a special election on Tuesday, June 4, 2013, to complete the remaining term of former U.S. Representative Jo Ann Emerson of Cape Girardeau. Emerson announced her resignation a month after being reelected with over 70 percent of the vote in the district. She resigned to become CEO of the National Rural Electric Cooperative.

Political culture

Douglas County is, like most other counties located in the GOP bastion of Southwest Missouri, a Republican stronghold in presidential elections. No Democratic presidential nominee has won Douglas County since William Jennings Bryan in 1896, and no other nominee has done so since 1864. While statewide elections tend to be closer throughout the state, this is not the case in Douglas County, as no Democratic gubernatorial nominee had won the county in over 50 years until Governor Jay Nixon's narrow pluralistic win in 2008. Furthermore, with all local elected offices being held by Republicans, voters have kept the traditionally Republican dominance alive in Douglas County.

Like most rural areas throughout the Bible Belt in Southwest Missouri, voters in Douglas County traditionally adhere to socially and culturally conservative principles which tend to strongly influence their Republican leanings. In 2004, Missourians voted on a constitutional amendment to define marriage as the union between a man and a woman—it overwhelmingly passed Douglas County with 85.78 percent of the vote. The initiative passed the state with 71 percent of support from voters as Missouri became the first state to ban same-sex marriage. In 2006, Missourians voted on a constitutional amendment to fund and legalize embryonic stem cell research in the state—it failed in Douglas County with 59.36 percent voting against the measure. The initiative narrowly passed the state with 51 percent of support from voters as Missouri became one of the first states in the nation to approve embryonic stem cell research. Despite Douglas County's longstanding tradition of supporting socially conservative platforms, voters in the county have a penchant for advancing populist causes like increasing the minimum wage. In 2006, Missourians voted on a proposition (Proposition B) to increase the minimum wage in the state to $6.50 an hour—it passed Douglas County with 71.97 percent of the vote. The proposition strongly passed every single county in Missouri with 78.99 percent voting in favor as the minimum wage was increased to $6.50 an hour in the state. During the same election, voters in five other states also strongly approved increases in the minimum wage.

Communities
The county has only one incorporated town: Ava, the county seat. Also, a number of current and historic communities are present:

 Ann
 Arden
 Arno
 Ava
 Basher
 Bertha
 Biggs
 Blanche
 Brushyknob
 Bryant
 Buckhart
 Champion
 Cheney
 Coldspring
 Cross Roads
 Denlow
 Depew
 Dogwood
 Drury
 Evans
 Fielden
 Filer
 Gentryville
 Girdner
 Goodhope
 Granada
 Hebron
 Hest
 Jackson Mill
 Merritt
 Midway
 Mount Zion
 Olathia
 Ongo
 Pansy
 Prior
 Red Bank
 Richville
 Rippee
 Rome
 Roosevelt
 Roy
 Smallett
 Squires
 Sweden
 Tigris
 Topaz
 Vanzant
 Vera Cruz
 Witty

See also
National Register of Historic Places listings in Douglas County, Missouri

References

Further reading
Searching for Booger County - Ozark Folk Histories,  Sandy Ray Chapin, Boogeyman Books (2002) 
Baldknobbers - Vigilantes on the Ozarks Frontier, Mary Hartman and Elmo Ingenthron, Pelican Publishing (1988)

External links
 Digitized 1930 Plat Book of Douglas County  from University of Missouri Division of Special Collections, Archives, and Rare Books
 https://web.archive.org/web/20110607040607/http://quickfacts.census.gov/qfd/states/29/29067.html

 
Missouri counties
1857 establishments in Missouri
Populated places established in 1857